Urry is a surname. Notable people with the surname include:

Chris Urry (born 1952), New Zealand Olympic sailor
Francis L. Urry, American actor
James Urry, New Zealand anthropologist
Sir John Urry (soldier) (died 1650), Scottish royalist soldier
John Urry (literary editor) (1666–1715), literary editor, son of Sir William Urry
John Urry (sociologist)
Lewis Urry, Canadian inventor
Meg Urry, American astrophysicist
Michelle Urry, cartoon editor of Playboy
Phil Joel Urry, bassist for The Newsboys
Sir William Urry (died 1673–1677), Scottish royalist officer

See also
Hurry (surname)